Duchy of Durazzo may refer to:
 Duchy of Durazzo (Republic of Venice), a short-lived Venetian province in 1205–1213
 Duchy of Durazzo (Angevin), the remnant of the Angevin Kingdom of Albania between 1332 and 1368

See also
 Duchy of Dyrrachium